This is a list of Billboard magazine's Top Hot 100 songs of 1993.

See also
1993 in music
List of Billboard Hot 100 number-one singles of 1993
List of Billboard Hot 100 top-ten singles in 1993

References

1993 record charts
Billboard charts